Artur Fischer (31 December 1919 – 27 January 2016) was a German inventor. He is best known for inventing the plastic expanding wall plug.

Born in Tumlingen, Artur Fischer was the son of the village tailor Georg Fischer. His mother Pauline, who ironed collars to make ends meet, recognized her son’s mechanical aptitude and encouraged him at every turn, helping him set up a workbench at home and buying him the German equivalent of an Erector Set.

In the second world war, Fischer worked as an aircraft mechanic and survived the Battle of Stalingrad, leaving on the last plane. Later in the war he was captured in Italy and sent to a prisoner-of-war camp in England. After returning to his hometown in 1946, he found work as an assistant at an engineering company and began making lighters and loom switches out of military scrap. In 1948, he founded his own company, the Fischer Group.

Synchronized photo flash
In 1949, he invented synchronized flash light photography, which was later purchased by the camera company Agfa. Inspired by his inability to photograph his young daughter indoors, his insight was to synchronize an electronic flash with the camera shutter.

Wall plug
His most famous invention is the grey "S Plug" (Split-)Wallplug made from plastic materials (Polyamide) and is available in various shapes and sizes since 1958 (see Wall plug). Fischer held over 1100 patents and overtook Thomas Alva Edison, who held 1093 patents. Fischer also held 5867 trade rights and invented fischertechnik.

Further inventions are (bone-)plugs for fixing bone fractures and one of Fischer’s most recent inventions was a gadget that makes it possible to hold and cut the top off an egg of any size. He got started on the problem when a hotel owner complained to him that his guests, on opening their boiled eggs for breakfast, always made a mess.

References

 Helmut Engisch / Michael Zerhusen: Die Fischers: Eine schwäbische Dübel-Dynastie. Theiss, 
 Kathrin Wilkens: Der Herr der Dübel. in: Technology Review (German edition) May 2004, page 92.

External links
Biography of Arthur Fischer at dpma.de, The Inventors Gallery of the German Patent and Trade Mark Office
 Artur Fischer - Wall plug, synchronised flash and many more The European Patent Office film at YouTube 
Homepage of Margot Fischer-Weber fischer-Weber with documentations of the family lawsuit from her view

1919 births
2016 deaths
People from Freudenstadt (district)
20th-century German inventors
German manufacturing businesspeople
German toy industry businesspeople
Werner von Siemens Ring laureates
Grand Crosses with Star and Sash of the Order of Merit of the Federal Republic of Germany
Recipients of the Order of Merit of Baden-Württemberg